Louis Marquis (born 14 September 1929) is a former Swiss racewalker. He competed in the 20 km walk and the 50 km walk events at the 1960 Summer Olympics.

References

1929 births
Living people
Swiss male racewalkers
Olympic athletes of Switzerland
Athletes (track and field) at the 1960 Summer Olympics